G minor has been considered the key through which Wolfgang Amadeus Mozart best expressed sadness and tragedy, and many of his minor key works are in G minor. Though Mozart touched on various minor keys in his symphonies, G minor is the only minor key he used as a main key for his numbered symphonies.

In the Classical period, symphonies in G minor almost always used four horns, two in G and two in B alto. Another convention of G minor symphonies observed in Mozart's No. 25 and No. 40 was the choice of the subdominant of the relative key (B major), E major, for the slow movement; other non-Mozart examples of this practice include J. C. Bach Opus 6 No. 6 from 1769,  Haydn's No. 39 (1768/69) and Johann Baptist Wanhal's G minor symphony sometime before 1771 (Bryan Gm1).

Isolated sections in this key within Mozart's compositions may also evoke an atmosphere of grand tragedy, one example being the stormy G minor middle section to the otherwise serene B major slow movement in the Piano Concerto No. 20.

List of works

Here is a list of works and movements by Mozart in G minor:
God is our Refuge, K. 20
Andante from Symphony No. 5, K. 22 
Fugue in G minor, K. 154 (385k) (Organ) 
Allegro from String Quartet No. 6, K. 159 
Symphony No. 25, K. 183/173dB
"Vorrei punirti indegno" from La finta giardiniera, K. 196
"Agnus Dei" from Missa Brevis No. 9, K. 275/272b
Allegro in G minor, K. 312/189i/590d (first movement of an unfinished sonata)
6 Variations in G minor on "Helas, j'ai perdu mon amant", K. 360 (violin and piano) 
Andante con moto from Violin Sonata in E-Flat Major, K. 380
 "Rex tremendae", and "Domine Jesu Christe" (Andante con moto, G minor) from Requiem in D minor, K. 626
Fugue in G minor, K. 401/375e (Organ)
Andante un poco sostenuto from Piano Concerto No. 18, K. 456 
Der Zauberer, K. 472 
Piano Quartet No. 1, K. 478
String Quintet in G minor, K. 516
Symphony No. 40, K. 550
"Ach, ich fühl's" from The Magic Flute, K. 620

See also
Beethoven and C minor

References

G minor
G minor
Compositions by Wolfgang Amadeus Mozart
Music theory lists